The Men's Hockey Asia Cup is a men's international field hockey tournament organized by the Asian Hockey Federation. The winning team becomes the champion of Asia and qualifies for the FIH Hockey World Cup.

South Korea are the defending champions winning the 2022 edition. South Korea have won the most titles with five. India and Pakistan have both won the tournament three times.

The hosts together with six highest-ranked teams from the previous edition are qualified directly for the tournament, they are joined by the top team from the Men's AHF Cup or the top two teams if the host is already qualified.

Results

Summary

* = hosts

Team appearances

Debut of teams

See also
 Field hockey at the Asian Games
 Men's AHF Cup
 Men's Asian Champions Trophy
 Men's Hockey Junior Asia Cup
 Men's Indoor Hockey Asia Cup
 Women's Hockey Asia Cup

References

External links
Asian Hockey Federation
todor66.com archive

 
Asia Cup
Field hockey
Field hockey